Pandher is a village in Shahkot in Jalandhar district of Punjab State, India. The village is administrated by a sarpanch who is an elected representative of village as per Panchayati raj (India).

Transport 
Shahkot Malisian station is the nearest train station.

References 

Villages in Jalandhar district